Calmodulin-like protein 5 is a protein that in humans is encoded by the CALML5 gene.

This gene encodes a novel calcium binding protein expressed in the epidermis and related to the calmodulin family of calcium binding proteins. Functional studies with recombinant protein demonstrate it does bind calcium and undergoes a conformational change when it does so. Abundant expression is detected only in reconstructed epidermis and is restricted to differentiating keratinocytes. In addition, it can associate with transglutaminase 3, shown to be a key enzyme in the terminal differentiation of keratinocytes.

References

External links

Further reading

EF-hand-containing proteins